George Kent may refer to:

 George Kent Ltd, a British engineering company.
 Walter George Kent (1858–1938), chairman and managing director of George Kent Ltd
 George E. Kent (1920–1982), American professor of literature
 George P. Kent, American diplomat

See also
 Prince George, Duke of Kent (1902–1942)

 Jacob & Youngs, Inc. v. Kent, a case in which George Kent was defendant